Uda is a Japanese surname. Notable people with the surname include:

Arua Uda (born 1974), Papua New Guinean cricketer
, the 59th emperor of Japan
, the 91st emperor of Japan
, Japanese Paralympic triathlete
, Japanese anime director
, Japanese inventor
, Japanese cross-country skier
, Japanese road cyclist 
, Japanese table tennis player

Japanese-language surnames